NSND Nguyễn Trung Kiên (Kiến Xương, Thái Bình, 5 November 1939 – 27 January 2021) was a Vietnamese classical singer and People's Artist. With the late Quý Dương and Trần Hiếu, Kiên was counted as the 3C Trio (Vietnamese Tam ca 3C, from tam ca 3 “cụ”) - a term modelled on the Three Tenors.

He was no relation to the younger entertainer MC Trung Kiên.

References

External links
 

1939 births
2021 deaths
20th-century Vietnamese male singers
People from Thái Bình province
People's Artists of Vietnam